Breast cancer-related regulator of TP53 is a protein that in humans is encoded by the BCPR gene.

References